The 1907 Rock Island Independents season was their first season in existence. The team finished 2-1-3.

Schedule

References

Rock Island Independents seasons
Rock Island
Rock Island